Meillard is a surname. Notable people with the surname include: 

Loïc Meillard (born 1996), Swiss skier
Mélanie Meillard (born 1998), Swiss skier

See also
Maillard (surname)
Millard (surname)